Marlene Dayman (born 14 October 1949) is an Australian former swimmer. She competed in the women's 100 metre backstroke at the 1964 Summer Olympics. Earlier she had defied an instruction from the Australian Swimming Union not to march in the opening ceremony.

In March 1965 the union banned Dayman for three years and three fellow swimmers, Nan Duncan (three years), Dawn Fraser (ten years) and Linda McGill (four years), from swimming for defying their instruction. This effectively ended her swimming career. Dayman is the daughter of music promoter, talent manager and record label owner, Ivan Dayman.

References

External links
 

1949 births
Living people
Australian female backstroke swimmers
Olympic swimmers of Australia
Swimmers at the 1964 Summer Olympics
20th-century Australian women